The series of theatrical feature films about James Bond have been filmed since the 1960s; in each decade at least three movies have been filmed. Before the films there was an episode of the television series Climax! which was produced that adapted the novel Casino Royale into a one-hour TV movie.

TV movie
 Casino Royale (1954)

Feature films

1960s

 Dr. No (1962)
 From Russia with Love (1963)
 Goldfinger (1964)
 Thunderball (1965)
 You Only Live Twice (1967)
 Casino Royale (1967)
 On Her Majesty's Secret Service (1969)

1970s

 Diamonds Are Forever (1971)
 Live and Let Die (1973)
 The Man with the Golden Gun (1974)
 The Spy Who Loved Me (1977)
 Moonraker (1979)

1980s

 For Your Eyes Only (1981)
 Never Say Never Again (1983)
 Octopussy (1983)
 A View to a Kill (1985)
 The Living Daylights (1987)
 Licence to Kill (1989)

1990s

 GoldenEye (1995)
 Tomorrow Never Dies (1997)
 The World Is Not Enough (1999)

2000s

 Die Another Day (2002)
 Casino Royale (2006)
 Quantum of Solace (2008)

2010s
 Skyfall (2012)
 Spectre (2015)

2020s
 No Time to Die (2021)

References

James Bond in film
History of James Bond